= Pronunciation of loanwords in English =

How borrowed words are pronounced in English

Loanwords in English are words adopted from other languages, such as piano or café. Loanwords make up a large portion of the English language, with many being 'loans' of Old English.
